UFC on ESPN: Tsarukyan vs. Gamrot (also known as UFC on ESPN 38 and UFC Vegas 57) was a mixed martial arts event produced by the Ultimate Fighting Championship that took place on June 25, 2022, at the UFC Apex facility in Enterprise, Nevada, part of the Las Vegas Metropolitan Area, United States.

Background
A lightweight bout between Arman Tsarukyan and former KSW Featherweight and Lightweight Champion Mateusz Gamrot headlined the event.

A flyweight bout between Tagir Ulanbekov and Tyson Nam was expected to take place at the event, despite never being officially announced. They were originally expected to meet a year earlier at UFC on ESPN: The Korean Zombie vs. Ige, but the matchup did not take place due to an undisclosed illness for Ulanbekov.

Former UFC Flyweight Championship challenger (also The Ultimate Fighter: Tournament of Champions flyweight winner) Tim Elliott was expected to face Amir Albazi in a flyweight bout. However, Elliott pulled out in mid June due to anterior cruciate ligament (ACL) and meniscus injuries. Albazi was rescheduled against Francisco Figueiredo at UFC 278.

Results

Bonus awards
The following fighters received $50,000 bonuses.
 Fight of the Night: Mateusz Gamrot vs. Arman Tsarukyan
 Performance of the Night:  Shavkat Rakhmonov, Josh Parisian, and Thiago Moisés

See also 

 List of UFC events
 List of current UFC fighters
 2022 in UFC

References 

UFC on ESPN
2022 in mixed martial arts
June 2022 sports events in the United States
2022 in sports in Nevada
Mixed martial arts in Las Vegas
Sports competitions in Las Vegas